This was the first edition of the tournament.

Daniel Altmaier won the title after defeating Nicolás Jarry 7–6(7–1), 4–6, 6–3 in the final.

Seeds

Draw

Finals

Top half

Bottom half

References

External links
Main draw
Qualifying draw

Platzmann-Sauerland Open - 1